Iginniarfik is a village in the municipality of Qeqertalik, in western Greenland. Its population was 76 in 2020.

Transport 

Air Greenland serves the village as part of government contract, with winter-only helicopter flights from Iginniarfik Heliport to Ikerasaarsuk Heliport and Kangaatsiaq Heliport. Settlement flights in the Aasiaat Archipelago are unique in that they are operated only during winter and spring.

During summer and autumn, when the waters of Disko Bay are navigable, communication between settlements is by sea only, serviced by Diskoline. The ferry links Iginniarfik with Kangaatsiaq, Attu, Ikerasaarsuk, Niaqornaarsuk, and Aasiaat.

Population 
The population of Iginniarfik has been stable in the last two decades.

References

Populated places in Greenland
Populated places of Arctic Greenland
Qeqertalik